Tetraulax lateraloides is a species of beetle in the family Cerambycidae. It was described by Stephan von Breuning in 1948.

References

Tetraulaxini
Beetles described in 1948
Taxa named by Stephan von Breuning (entomologist)